Philo Case Fuller (August 14, 1787 near Marlboro, Middlesex County, Massachusetts – August 16, 1855 near Geneva, Ontario County, New York) was an American lawyer and politician.

Early life
Fuller was born on August 14, 1787 in Marlborough, Massachusetts.  He was the son of Samuel Fuller and Delia (née Case) Fuller. He served in the War of 1812.

Fuller was educated at the local common schools.  He studied law and was admitted to the bar in 1813, and practiced in Geneseo, New York.

Career
Fuller served as private secretary to General William Wadsworth of Geneseo, New York and practiced law in Albany, New York.

From 1829 to 1830, he was a member of the New York State Assembly (Livingston Co.) in 52nd and 53rd New York State Legislatures.  From 1831 to 1832, he was a member of the New York State Senate (8th D.), sitting in the 54th and 55th New York State Legislatures.

Fuller was elected as an Anti-Mason to the 23rd United States Congress, and re-elected as an Anti-Jacksonian to the 24th United States Congress, holding office from March 4, 1833, to September 2, 1836, when he resigned, and moved to Adrian, Michigan where he engaged in banking and was president of the Erie and Kalamazoo Railroad.

He was a member of the Michigan House of Representatives in 1841 and was Speaker until April 3 when he resigned having been appointed Assistant United States Postmaster General by President William Henry Harrison. Later that year, he was an unsuccessful Whig candidate for Governor of Michigan. Afterwards he returned to Geneseo, New York.

On December 18, 1850, he was appointed New York State Comptroller, and served for the remainder of Washington Hunt's unexpired term until the end of 1851.

Personal life
In April 1817, he married Sophia Nowlen (ca. 1791–1850), a native of Connecticut. Their children were:

 Samuel Lucius Fuller (1818–1897), who served as private secretary to Charles H. Carroll.
 Edward Philo Fuller (1820–1866), who married Cornelia Granger Carroll (1826–1909), daughter of Congressman Charles H. Carroll
 George A. Fuller (b. 1822).

Fuller died near Geneva, New York on August 16, 1855.  He was buried at the Temple Hill Cemetery in Geneseo.

References
Notes

Sources

Philo Fuller Political Graveyard
List of Speakers of the MI House, at MI Legislature (PDF)
Fuller family, at rootsweb
The New York Civil List compiled by Franklin Benjamin Hough (pages 34, 141 and 274; Weed, Parsons and Co., 1858)

External links
 FULLER, Philo Case, 1787-1855 Guide to Research Collections.

1787 births
1855 deaths
People from Marlborough, Massachusetts
Anti-Masonic Party members of the United States House of Representatives from New York (state)
Burials in New York (state)
New York (state) National Republicans
National Republican Party members of the United States House of Representatives
Members of the New York State Assembly
New York (state) state senators
Michigan Whigs
Speakers of the Michigan House of Representatives
New York State Comptrollers
19th-century American railroad executives
People from Adrian, Michigan
People from Geneseo, New York
19th-century American politicians